The Play-offs of the 2007 Fed Cup Europe/Africa Zone Group I were the final stages of the Group I Zonal Competition involving teams from Europe and Africa. Using the positions determined in their pools, the sixteen teams faced off to determine their placing in the 2007 Fed Cup Europe/Africa Zone Group I. The top two teams advanced to World Group II play-offs, and the bottom two teams were relegated down to the Europe/Africa Zone Group II for the next year.

Promotion play-offs
The first placed teams of each pool were placed against each other in two head-to-head rounds. The winner of the rounds advanced to the World Group II play-offs, where they would get a chance to advance to the World Group II for next year.

Romania vs. Serbia

Ukraine vs. Poland

Fifth to Seventh play-off
The second placed teams of each pool were placed against each other in two ties. The winner of each tie was allocated fifth place in the Group while the losers were allocated seventh.

Switzerland vs. Slovenia

Belarus vs. Luxembourg

Ninth to Eleventh play-off
The third placed teams of each pool were placed against each other in two ties. The winner of each tie was allocated ninth place in the Group while the losers were allocated eleventh.

Denmark vs. Hungary

Sweden vs. Great Britain

Relegation play-offs
The last placed teams of each pool were placed against each other in two ties. The losing team of the rounds were relegated to Group II for next year.

Netherlands vs. Estonia

Lithuania vs. Bulgaria

Final placements

 Serbia and Ukraine advanced to the World Group II Play-offs. The Serbians were drawn against Slovakia, and they lost 1–4, which thus caused them to be relegated back to Group I for the next year. The Ukrainians, however, were drawn against Australia, and they won 4–1. They thus advanced to World Group II.
 Estonia and Lithuania were relegated down to Europe/Africa Zone Group II for the next year. They respectively placed first and second in the same pool, and thus both advanced to the advancement play-offs. Estonia won theirs, and thus proceeded back to Group I for 2009, while Lithuania lost and therefore remained in Group II.

See also
Fed Cup structure

References

External links
 Fed Cup website

2007 Fed Cup Europe/Africa Zone